Forrest Herman Shuford (June 3, 1897 – May 19, 1954) was an American civil servant who served as North Carolina Commissioner of Labor from 1938 to 1954.

Early life 
Forrest Shuford was born on June 3, 1897 in Lawndale, North Carolina, United States to J. M. Shuford and Ella Copeland Shuford. He was educated in Cleveland County public schools and graduated from Piedmont High School in Lawndale. He enlisted in the United States Navy on June 3, 1918 and served during World War I. On June 3, 1922 he married May Renfrow. Though he was raised as a Methodist Christian, his wife was an Episcopalian and he switched to her denomination following their marriage. They had two sons.

Shuford attended Berea College in Berea, Kentucky for three years. Afterwards, he studied textiles for a year at North Carolina State College of Agriculture and Engineering, before moving to New England to work at textile mills in Harrisville, Rhode Island. He subsequently moved to Gastonia, North Carolina to become assistant superintendent of Groves Mills. He left the job after contracting tuberculosis, for which he was treated at Oteen Veterans Administration Hospital, and became a school teacher. Shuford served as principal of Ellenboro High School from 1924 to 1925 and Spindale School from 1925 to 1926 before moving to High Point, where he worked as the city's Boys' Commissioner from 1925 until 1933. That year he was hired by North Carolina Commissioner of Labor Arthur L. Fletcher as Chief Inspector in the Department of Labor. He was granted a leave of absence from the department from 1934 to 1935 to serve as the National Recovery Administration Labor Compliance Officer for North Carolina.

Political career 
Shuford was a member of the Democratic Party. In 1938 Fletcher resigned as Commissioner of Labor. North Carolina Governor Clyde Hoey appointed Shuford to fill the vacancy on September 12, as he was the most senior official within the labor department. He would subsequently be elected to four terms in the office. In 1944 he, at the direction of President Franklin D. Roosevelt, served as Advisor to American Governmental Delegates at an International Labour Organization conference in Philadelphia. In 1947 he served on the federal Bureau of Labor's Standards Safety Advisory Committee. Shuford died on May 19, 1954 at a hospital in Washington D. C. after being stricken by heart trouble while attending a conference on migrant labor.

References

Works cited 
 

1897 births
North Carolina Commissioners of Labor
North Carolina Democrats
United States Navy personnel of World War I
1954 deaths